The 2013–14 season was Dukla Prague's third consecutive season in the Czech First League.

Players

Squad information

Transfers 
Dukla announced the signing of Slovak midfielder Marek Hlinka in July 2013. Slovak defender Lukáš Štetina, who had spent the last season on loan at Dukla, signed for the club permanently. Youth team players Michal Jeřábek and Pavel Čapek trained with the senior team for the first time, the former going on to make his club debut later in the season. Dukla secured two players on loan during summer 2013, namely Jakub Mareš on a season-long loan from Mladá Boleslav, and Jan Pázler from Jablonec. Marek Hanousek returned to Dukla on loan in September 2013.

Striker Jan Svatonský left Dukla after six years at the club, heading to second division side MFK Karviná. Midfielder Tomáš Borek left and signed for Turkish side Konyaspor. Jakub Sklenář left the club following the expiry of his contract. Defender Tomáš Pospíšil and midfielder Ondřej Šiml went out on loan, to FK Pardubice and FC MAS Táborsko respectively.

Management and coaching staff

Source:

Statistics

Appearances and goals 
 Starts + Substitute appearances.

|}

Goalscorers

Home attendance
The club was 19th of the 20 First League clubs in terms of average league attendance; only 1. SC Znojmo had a lower average attendance.

Czech First League

Results by round

Results summary

League table

Matches

July

August

September

October

November

February

March

April

May

Cup 

As a First League team, Dukla entered the Cup at the second round stage. In the second round, Dukla faced third league side Štěchovice, where they ran out 4–1 winners. The third round match at second league side Třinec was more difficult; Marek Hanousek put Dukla ahead before Třinec equalised late in the game, to send the match to a penalty shootout. Matěj Hanousek scored the deciding penalty as Dukla went through 7–6 on penalties.

In the fourth round, Dukla faced First League opposition for the first time, being paired with Příbram. Dukla won both matches of the two-legged tie, 4–0 and 2–1, to advance 6–1 on aggregate and set up a quarter final against Sparta Prague. In the spring, the first of the tie's two matches was played at Juliska, Dukla winning 2–1. However Dukla advanced no further in the competition, losing 2–0 in the return leg and 3–2 on aggregate.

References 

Dukla Prague
FK Dukla Prague seasons